Sarah Sumner is a Christian egalitarian theologian. From 2010 to 2012, she was dean of the A.W. Tozer Theological Seminary at Simpson University in Redding, California. Currently, Sumner serves as the President of Right On Mission, a seminary. She is also an adjunct professor at Trinity Law School in Santa Ana, California.

Sarah Sumner is known for her articles and books on Christian women in leadership, godly anger, leadership, seminary education, and marriage.

Regarding the debate on women in the church, Sarah Sumner is an evangelical theologian. She attempts to build consensus in Christian Leadership. Despite claims to the contrary, Sumner does not advocate for the ordination of women in Protestant churches.

Education and career 
Sumner has a Bachelor of Education from Baylor University, a Master of Theology from Wheaton College, and a Master of Business Administration from Azusa Pacific University. She graduated from Trinity Evangelical Divinity School with a Ph.D. in systematic theology, and was the first woman to do so.

In May 2011, Sumner was Trinity's Commencement Speaker for the Class of 2011. She was an associate professor of ministry and theology at Azusa Pacific, when she published her first book.

Books 
Sarah Sumner has published four books:
 Men and Women in the Church, IVP 2003.
 Leadership Above the Line, Tyndale, 2006.
 Just How Married Do You Want To Be?  IVP, 2008.
 Angry Like Jesus: Using His Example To Spark Your Moral Courage Fortress Press, 2015.

References

Bibliography

Living people
American evangelicals
21st-century Protestant theologians
Women Christian theologians
American Christian theologians
Systematic theologians
Baylor University alumni
Wheaton College (Illinois) alumni
Azusa Pacific University alumni
Trinity Evangelical Divinity School alumni
American women academics
Azusa Pacific University faculty
American relationships and sexuality writers
Leadership scholars
Gender studies academics
Year of birth missing (living people)